Untitled Pizza Movie is a 2019 seven-part documentary series written and directed by David Shapiro. It premiered at the 2020 Sundance Film Festival, where it received the “Best DocuSeries” award. The docuseries had an exclusive online run at Metrograph between February 26 and March 14.

Synopsis 
In Untitled Pizza Movie, Shapiro narrativizes his own past, the life of his late friend Leeds Atkinson, and a once-criminal pizza man named Andrew Belluci, repiecing footage he had shot alongside Atkinson in the 1990s while on a mission to find New York's best pizza.

Parts 
 Part One: Ice Cube Trays
 Part Two: Eat To Win In The Elevator
 Part Three: Pizza Purgatory
 Part Four: Zig Zag
 Part Five: The Natufian Culture Of 9,000 BC
 Part Six: Clams
 Part Seven: Mars Bar

References

External links 
 

2019 films
2019 documentary films
Films about cities